Sheikh Hemayet Hossain Mia is a retired Bangladeshi police officer and former head of the Criminal Investigation Department. Earlier, he served as an Additional Inspector General of Police at the Armed Police Battalion.

Early life 
Mia is from Faridpur District.

Career 

Froom 28 September 1998 to 16 May 2001, Mia was the Superintendent of Police of Khagrachari District.

Mia was denied promotion during the 2001 to 2006 Bangladesh Nationalist Party government along with officers from Gopalganj District and Hindu officers as they were perceived to be loyal to the opposition party, Awami League. In 2001, he was the Superintendent of Police of Jhalakathi District. He was then transferred to Rajshahi Metropolitan Police in 2004 as Deputy Commissioner and denied promotion while everyone in his batch received promotion. He was promoted to Additional Deputy Inspector General after his entire batch had been promoted to Deputy Inspector General and he was then posted Barisal Police range. He was then stationed at Police Training Center, Rangpur.

On 15 January 2015, Mia was appointed head of the Criminal Investigation Department. He had been serving in the Armed Police Battalion as additional inspector general of police. He inaugurated a new office of the Criminal Investigation Department at Joypurhat District. In 2017, he was awarded the Bangladesh Police Medal. He received the President Police Medal in 2018.

Mia retired in May 2019 and was replaced by Shafiqul Islam as head head of the Criminal Investigation Department.

References 

Living people
Bangladeshi police officers
People from Faridpur District
Year of birth missing (living people)
Criminal Investigation Department (Bangladesh) officers